Terpsinoë is a genus of diatom. Species include T. americana, T. javanicum, and T. musica.

References

Further reading
 
 

Diatom genera
Taxa described in 1843
Taxa named by Christian Gottfried Ehrenberg